Mazzarella is an Italian surname. Notable people with the surname include:

Carlo Mazzarella (1919–1993), Italian actor and journalist
Domenico Mazzarella (1802–1854), Italian Roman Catholic priest
Kathleen Mazzarella, American CEO of Graybar Electric
Marcello Mazzarella (born 1963), Italian actor
Piero Mazzarella (1928–2013), Italian actor

Italian-language surnames